Laury Jane McGarrigle (born 26 April 1941) is a Canadian songwriter, musician and music publisher, known mainly for her work with her younger sisters, singers Kate & Anna McGarrigle. She is the co-author of a book about the three sisters' childhood and musical experiences.

Early life
McGarrigle grew up in Montreal, Quebec, with her sisters Kate and Anna.

Career
When McGarrigle's younger sisters formed a singer-songwriter duo, Kate & Anna McGarrigle, Jane wrote and performed several songs with them. She produced their album Love Over and Over.

The song "Love Is", which she co-wrote, has been recorded by Nana Mouskouri, Emmylou Harris, and Renato Russo (who also recorded the co-written "Man Is an Island"). She served as her sisters' music manager for a time, and also managed producers Pierre Marchand (Sarah McLachlan) and Robbi Finkel (Cirque du Soleil) and the group Three O'Clock Train. 

McGarrigle co-composed, with her sisters, the scores to the Canadian film Tommy Tricker and the Stamp Traveller and its sequel The Return of Tommy Tricker. 

She appeared in the 1999 film The McGarrigle Hour, a collection of concert footage.

McGarrigle is a member of the Society of Composers, Authors and Music Publishers of Canada (SOCAN) and served on its board of directors from 1990 to 2000. Until recently, she was also on the board of the Songwriters Association of Canada. In 2013, she was part of a SOCAN representative group for a streamed panel, "Can the Music Industry be Saved?"

With her sister Anna, she co-authored Mountain City Girls, a family memoir published in 2015 by Random House Canada. The book contains stories about the childhood and musical careers of the three sisters.

References 

1941 births
Living people
Canadian songwriters
Canadian film score composers
Musicians from Montreal
Quebec people of Irish descent
Canadian women composers
Writers from Montreal
Canadian music managers
McGarrigle-Wainwright-Roche family